is a Japanese former professional footballer who played as a goalkeeper for Kashima Antlers and the Japan national team.

Club career
Sogahata was born in Kashima on August 2, 1979. He joined J1 League club Kashima Antlers based in his local from youth team in 1998. He debuted against Avispa Fukuoka on May 8, 1999 and played several matches until 2000. Although he could not play many matches behind Japan national team player Daijiro Takakuwa until 2000, Sogahata played in semifinals and final at 2000 J.League Cup and Antlers won the champions. He was also selected New Hero Awards. In 2001, he became a regular goalkeeper instead Takakuwa and Sogahata played as regular goalkeeper for long time. Antlers won the champions 2001 J1 League for two years in a row. In 2002 season, he was selected Best Eleven award. Antlers also won the champions in 2002 J.League Cup. In 2007, Antlers won the champions in J1 League for the first time in six years. Antlers also won the champions in 2007 Emperor's Cup. Antlers won the champions in J1 League for three years in a row (2007–2009). From 2010 season, Antlers won the champions 2010 Emperor's Cup, 2011 and 2012 J.League Cup. He also played all matches from 2008 season to 2014 season. He played for 244 consecutive matches until last match in 2014 season which is J1 League record. In 2015, although he could not play all matches in J1 League, Antlers won the champions in J.League Cup. In 2016, Antlers won the champions in J1 League and qualified for 2016 Club World Cup as host country champions. At Club World Cup, he played all four matches and won the 2nd place. In 2017, Antlers gained new goalkeeper Kwoun Sun-tae and Sogahata battles for the position with Kwoun Sun-tae. However Sogahata could not play many matches behind Kwoun Sun-tae from 2017. In 2018 AFC Champions League, he played four matches and Antlers won the champions first Asian title in the club history.

On December 24, 2020, Sogahata announced his retirement after more than twenty years with the club.

International career
On November 7, 2001, Sogahata debuted for Japan national team against Italy. However he could not play many matches behind Yoshikatsu Kawaguchi and Seigo Narazaki. Sogahata was a member of Japan for 2002 FIFA World Cup. He played three games for Japan until 2003.

In August 2004, Sogahata was selected Japan U23 national team as over aged for 2004 Summer Olympics. At this tournament, he played full time in all three matches. Japan exited in the first round, having finished fourth in group B, below group winners Paraguay, Italy and Ghana.

Career statistics

Club

International

Honours
Kashima Antlers
 J1 League (6): 2000, 2001, 2007, 2008, 2009, 2016
 Emperor's Cup: 2000, 2007, 2010, 2016
 J.League Cup: 2000, 2002, 2011, 2012, 2015
 Japanese Super Cup: 1999, 2009, 2010, 2017
 AFC Champions League: 2018

Individual
 J.League Cup New Hero Award : 2001
 J.League Best Eleven – 2002

References

External links
 
 
 Japan National Football Team Database
 
 
 Profile at Kashima Antlers 

1979 births
Living people
Association football people from Ibaraki Prefecture
Japanese footballers
Japan international footballers
J1 League players
Kashima Antlers players
2002 FIFA World Cup players
Olympic footballers of Japan
Footballers at the 2004 Summer Olympics
Association football goalkeepers